Fort Monmouth is a former installation of the Department of the Army in Monmouth County, New Jersey. A separate area (Camp Charles Wood) to the west includes post housing, a golf course, and additional office and laboratory facilities. A rail line, owned by Conrail, runs through Camp Charles Wood and out to Naval Weapons Station Earle. The post is like a small town, including a Post Exchange (PX), health clinic, gas station and other amenities. Until the September 11, 2001 terrorist attacks the post was open to the public to drive through; after that time, the post was closed to all but authorized personnel. The main road through the fort was reopened to the public in 2017.

The post was home to several units of the U.S. Army Materiel Command and offices of the Army Acquisition Executive (AAE) that research and manage Command and Control, Communications, Computing, Intelligence, Surveillance and Reconnaissance (C4ISR) capabilities and related technology, as well as an interservice organization designed to coordinate C4ISR, an academic preparatory school, an explosive ordnance disposal (EOD) unit, a garrison services unit, an Army health clinic, and a Veterans Administration health clinic. Other agencies, including the Federal Bureau of Investigation, Federal Emergency Management Agency and the National Security Agency, have presences on the post.

The post was selected for closure by the Base Realignment and Closure Commission in 2005. Most Army functions and personnel were required to be moved to Army facilities in Maryland—such as Aberdeen Proving Ground—and Ohio by 2011. The post officially closed on September 15, 2011. However, it was temporarily reopened on December 2, 2012, for the evacuation of the borough of Paulsboro's residents to be temporarily resettled until it was deemed safe for them to move back to Paulsboro, following a freight train derailment on November 30, 2012.

History
For more information, see the official U.S. Army CECOM Life Cycle Management Command (LCMC) / Fort Monmouth Historical Office website  or Fort Monmouth Timeline  (Microsoft Word document)

The installation began with the lease of a defunct Monmouth Park Racecourse (later re-opened at another site in 1946) by the Army for a training site for officers. The location near Eatontown, with rail sidings out of Hoboken and proximity to the port of Little Silver, was ideal. Known temporarily as Camp Little Silver, it was renamed Camp Alfred Vail shortly after in September 1917. The Chief Signal Officer authorized the purchase of Camp Vail in 1919. The Signal Corps School relocated to Camp Vail from Fort Leavenworth that year. The Signal Corps Board followed in 1924. In August 1925 the installation was granted permanent status and was renamed Fort Monmouth. It was named in honor of the soldiers of the American Revolutionary War who died in the Battle of Monmouth; aptly, it is also located in Monmouth County. The first permanent building was built in 1928. Other structures were built to house units the Army consolidated at Fort Monmouth.

In 1928 the first radio-equipped meteorological balloon reached the upper atmosphere, a forerunner of weather sounding techniques universally used today. In 1938 the U.S. Army's first radio-based aircraft detection and ranging system (later called radar) was developed on post. A production model of this equipment detected the oncoming Japanese air attack on Pearl Harbor, but the warning it provided was discounted. In 1946 celestial communication was proved feasible, when the radar developed by the Project Diana team was used to bounce radio signals off the moon.

During the late 20th century Fort Monmouth was home to the US Army Chaplain Center and School (USACHCS).  Enlisted soldiers, non-commissioned officers (NCOs) and officers training to become Chaplain Assistants and Chaplains were trained at Fort Monmouth.

World War II
Additional property was purchased in 1941 for Camp Coles near Red Bank, Camp Charles Wood in Tinton Falls, and Camp Evans in Wall Township. At its peak during World War II, Fort Monmouth measured , and had billeting space for 1,559 officers and 19,786 enlisted personnel. The Eastern Signal Corps Training Center consisted of the Eastern Signal Corps Schools (enlisted, officer candidate, and officers) and the Replacement Training Center at Camp Charles Wood.  The Signal Corps Officer Candidate School (OCS), the major activity on the main post, graduated 21,033 new Signal Corps second lieutenants between 1941 and 1946.

More communications units, including the Pigeon Breeding and Training Center, were consolidated into Fort Monmouth after the war ended. The pigeon service was discontinued in 1957; the birds were either sold at auction or donated to zoos.

Special effects artist Harry Redmond, Jr. designed and constructed a new film studio for the Army Film Training Lab at Fort Monmouth during World War II.

Rosenbergs
Julius Rosenberg had worked as a radar inspector at Fort Monmouth in 1942 and 1943. It is from the fort that he was accused and convicted of stealing proximity fuze plans and passing them on to the Soviet Union. Documents released by Russia after the Cold War showed that Julius Rosenberg was indeed a spy. Joseph McCarthy claimed in October 1953 that Julius Rosenberg had set up a wartime spy ring at Fort Monmouth, and that the ring might still be in operation. Two Fort Monmouth scientists, Joel Barr and Alfred Sarant, fled to the Soviet Union.

The hysteria surrounding Fort Monmouth and the Rosenbergs was not limited to Julius and Ethel; others with the last name Rosenberg (or Kaplan) lost their security clearance for no reason other than sharing a name with communists.

Final years as an Army post

Before its BRAC closing was announced, Fort Monmouth was the home to the CECOM Life Cycle Management Command (CECOM LCMC). CECOM LCMC was a lead command for the Army in the area of C4ISR development, acquisition and sustainment. Though no longer the home of the US Army Signal Corps (after its move to Fort Gordon, Georgia in the 1970s), Fort Monmouth is sometimes referred to as the "Soul of the Signal Corps". It housed the official Time capsule of the Army Signal Corps until June 21, 2010, when it was removed for relocation to the U.S. Army Signal Center & School at Fort Gordon, Georgia. The fort also hosts the Avenue of Memories, a set of trees and monuments dedicated to Signal Corp soldiers who died in World War II. The memorial is a part of the main road through the Eatontown side of the fort.

Fort Monmouth hosted the following CECOM LCMC subordinate organizations:

 Communications-Electronics Command (CECOM), which supported and sustained C4ISR systems. Functional support centers of CECOM included the Software Engineering Center (SEC); Information Systems Engineering Command (ISEC); Logistics and Readiness Center (LRC); Central Technical Support Facility (CTSF) and Tobyhanna Army Depot (TYAD).
 CECOM Contracting Center (CCCE), which performed market research, solicited, awarded and administered contracts, grants, cooperative agreements and other transactions for communications and electronics systems.
 Communications-Electronics Research, Development and Engineering Center (CERDEC) which performed research and development in all areas of C4ISR, including Night Vision Goggles (NVGs), countermeasure equipment against Improvised Explosive Devices (IEDs), Shortstop Electronic Protection Systems (SEPS), and sensor systems that provided soldiers with a safe method for rapidly inspecting wells and underground locations.
 Two subordinate offices of the Army Acquisition Executive (AAE); the Program Executive Office for Command, Control, Communications Tactical (PEO C3T); the Program Executive Office for Intelligence, Electronic Warfare and Sensors (PEO IEW&S); and elements of the Program Executive Office for Enterprise Information Systems (PEO EIS).

Also located on the post were:

 the Joint Interoperability Test Command (JITC), a suborganization of Defense Information Systems Agency which coordinated joint interoperability between the Army, Navy, Marines, Coast Guard, Air Force, Special Operations Forces and Combatant Commands (COCOMs);
 the United States Military Academy Preparatory School, which trained 250 cadet candidates each year for admittance and entrance as plebes (freshmen) into the United States Military Academy at West Point, NY. The school was relocated to West Point in 2011.
 the 754th Explosive Ordnance Disposal (EOD) unit, which provided emergency response to state and federal authorities throughout New Jersey, New York, Rhode Island, Connecticut, Massachusetts, New Hampshire, Maine and Pennsylvania, and,
 the Patterson Army Health Clinic which served DoD service members and their families, including those stationed at NWS Earle and USCG Sandy Hook, NJ. It also served more than 7,000 veterans and their families, in support of the Veterans Administration (VA).

Most of the personnel located on the post were civilians employed by DoD, or employees of companies under contract with the DoD.

Fort Monmouth was also noted for its SunEagles Golf Course, one of the most prominent DoD golf courses in the nation. It is now open to the public.

School-aged children residing on post in grades 9 through 12 attended Monmouth Regional High School in Tinton Falls, part of the Monmouth Regional High School District.

Closure by BRAC
Fort Monmouth was recommended for closure by the Pentagon in May 2005. BRAC voted in August 2005 to close the post; its decision was upheld by President George Bush and Congress. An appeal headed by U.S. Representatives Frank Pallone and Rush D. Holt, Jr. to remove the post from the list was made to the BRAC commission, but was rejected.

In particular, BRAC recommended:

 Relocate the US Army Military Academy Preparatory School (USMAPS) to West Point, NY.
 Relocate the Joint Network Management System (JNMS) program, part of the Product Management Office for Network Operations - Current Force (PM NetOps-CF) to Fort Meade, MD. The Joint Network Management System (JNMS) program was cancelled by the Headquarters, Department of the Army (HQDA) prior to scheduled relocation of the program to Ft. Meade.
 Relocate the Budget/Funding, Contracting, Cataloging, Requisition Processing, Customer Services, Item Management, Stock Control, Weapon System Secondary Item Support, Requirements Determination, Integrated Materiel Management Technical Support Inventory Control Point functions for Consumable Items to Defense Supply Center Columbus, OH, and reestablish them as Defense Logistics Agency Inventory Control Point functions.
 Relocate the procurement management and related support functions for depot level repairables to Aberdeen Proving Ground (APG), MD, and designate them as Inventory Control Point functions, detachment of Defense Supply Center, Columbus, OH, and
 Relocate the remaining integrated materiel management, user, and related support functions to Aberdeen Proving Ground, MD, along with Information Systems, Sensors, Electronic Warfare, and Electronics Research and Development & Acquisition (RDA).
 Relocate the elements of the Program Executive Office for Enterprise Information Systems (PEO EIS) and consolidate into the existing PEO EIS facilities at Fort Belvoir, Virginia.

The DoD estimated the closure of Fort Monmouth would cause the loss of 9,737 jobs (5,272 direct and 4,465 indirect jobs) between 2006 and 2011, leading to a 0.8% increase in unemployment. DoD also calculated the closure and other changes would save it about $1 billion in the long run.

However, in June 2007, an investigation by the Asbury Park Press revealed that the projected cost of closing Fort Monmouth and moving its research functions to Aberdeen, Maryland, had doubled from $780 million to $1.5 billion. To this was to be added the $3.3 billion loss to New Jersey’s economy, coupled with the estimated $16 billion it would cost Maryland for needed infrastructure improvements to accommodate the largest job influx since World War II. In addition, recent Government Accountability Office (GAO) findings uncovered substantial errors in the Army estimation of BRAC cost savings—in one case turning a projected saving of $1 billion into one of just $31 million. In light of these issues, the House Armed Services Committee was to hold a hearing on the BRAC 2005 legislation. The final closure ceremony was held on September 15, 2011.

Redevelopment
On April 28, 2006, Governor of New Jersey Jon Corzine signed into law the Fort Monmouth Economic Revitalization Act, which established the Fort Monmouth Revitalization Planning Authority, to plan the redevelopment of Fort Monmouth once it closed. The legislation creating the commission, proposed by State Senators Joseph Kyrillos and Ellen Karcher, received bipartisan support, but only after wrangling in the legislature over its composition and authority. FMERPA completed the Fort Monmouth Reuse and Redevelopment Plan in 2008, although an appellate court threw out the portion of the plan concerning affordable housing.

FMERPA is no longer active following the creation of the Fort Monmouth Economic Revitalization Authority (FMERA) to provide investment, continuity and economic growth to the communities impacted by the federal government's decision to close Fort Monmouth. The bill was sponsored by Sen. Jennifer Beck (R-Monmouth) and Assembly members Joseph Cryan (D-Union), Albert Coutinho (D-Essex), Angel Fuentes (D-Camden), Annette Quijano (D-Union) and Upendra Chivukula (D-Somerset) and signed into law by Gov. Chris Christie Tuesday, August 17, 2010.

The authority holds meetings at their headquarters, located in the former post library in Oceanport. As mandated by federal law, the authority must advertise for notices of interest from any state, county, municipal, or private, non-profit agency which would provide homeless assistance to Monmouth County residents.

In December 2016, the Monmouth County Board of Chosen Freeholders issued $33 million in bonds to allow FMERA to purchase outright  of land on the base from the Army. As a condition of the bonds, the county reconstructed the main road through the base to allow for public travel between Route 35 / CR 537 and Oceanport Avenue for the first time since 2001. The road reopened on January 17, 2017 and subsequently became an extension of CR 537.

In October 2022, Netflix signed to build a production complex at Mega Parcel. The contract was facilitated by the Fort Monmouth Economic Revitalization Authority (FMERA). The property was purchased for 55 million dollars, with a projected investment of 850 million dollars into construction. It is estimated to generate an estimated 1500 permanent jobs for the area. The contract comes after years of difficulty repurposing the property. In 2021, an early project proposal was to develop an arts community and cultural center within the fort. Delays in construction and infrastructure, as well as the COVID-19 pandemic, caused the project to be terminated. Other projects include the revitalization of a bowling alley located within the fort. In 2022, the Borough Council of Eatontown approved a proposal to develop 275 housing units in place of the fort's former housing, 55 of which would be affordable housing units. FMERA also proposed further commercial development constituting a gas station, grocery store, and restaurant adjacent to said housing.

On December 21, 2022, Governor Phil Murphy described the Netflix's purchase of the Mega Parcel as a "transformative investment” for New Jersey. Eatontown's mayor Anthony Talerico commented on the potential economic growth the project will bring to the surrounding area. Oceanport's mayor Jay Coffey praised the project and cited "social revitalization" that Netflix would bring to Fort Monmouth. Public opinion from Oceanport and Eatontown residents was largely positive. It is projected that this production campus will accrue an estimated maximum of 4.6 billion dollars in revenue over the next 20 years.

The proposed redevelopment project will be located adjacent to major public transportation outlets such as NJ Transit lines, the Garden State Parkway, and New Jersey State Rt. 35. Estimations for the size of the planned campus are between 180,000 and 480,000 square feet. The development will contain 12 sound stages, various production buildings, and office buildings. Governor Phil Murphy wrote Netflix a letter to petition them to purchase land in New Jersey over the original property in Georgia due to Georgia’s controversial changes in voter laws.

Fort Monmouth will also be the site of redevelopment by RWJ Barnabas Health in New Jersey. In December of 2022, a deal was finalized for the purchase of the former Myer Center for $8 million. RWJ Barnabas Health plans to replace the building with an extension of their medical campus. The new construction plans entail an ambulatory care pavilion as well as a cancer center.

See also
 List of World War II military service football teams
Marilyn Levy, a chemist at Fort Monmouth from 1953 to 1979

Footnotes

Further reading
 Staff of the Historical Office; Office of the Deputy Chief of Staff for Operations and Plans; US Army CECOM Life Cycle Management Command, A History Of Army Communications And Electronics At Fort Monmouth, New Jersey (1917—2007). Washington, DC: U.S. Government Printing Office, 2009.

External links

Fort Monmouth at Flickr Commons

Fort Monmouth website - connection failed 2012-01-26
Information BRAC
FMERA website
Battle for Fort Monmouth, a series of articles on the closing of Fort Monmouth by BRAC and the unsuccessful attempt to keep it open, published in the Asbury Park Press, accessed May 19, 2009

Buildings and structures in Monmouth County, New Jersey
Monmouth
United States Army Signals Intelligence Service installations
Research installations of the United States Army
Closed installations of the United States Army
Historic American Engineering Record in New Jersey
Eatontown, New Jersey
Oceanport, New Jersey
Tinton Falls, New Jersey
1917 establishments in New Jersey